Mark Cecil Senn (1 June 1878 – 10 January 1951) was a Canadian farmer, merchant, teacher and politician. Senn served as a Conservative and Progressive Conservative party member of the House of Commons of Canada. He was born in Oneida, Ontario.

He was first elected to Parliament at the Haldimand riding in the 1921 general election, initially under the Conservative party. Senn was re-elected in 1925, 1926, 1930, 1935, 1940 and 1945. He did not stand for re-election in 1949 due to health problems. Senn died at his residence in Oneida Township on 10 January 1951, survived by his wife, three sons and three daughters.

References

External links
 

1878 births
1951 deaths
Canadian farmers
Canadian merchants
Canadian schoolteachers
Conservative Party of Canada (1867–1942) MPs
Progressive Conservative Party of Canada MPs
Members of the House of Commons of Canada from Ontario